The Bangladesh Shooting Sport Federation is the national sports federation responsible for promoting and regulating shooting sports in Bangladesh.

History 
The Bangladesh Shooting Sport Federation was founded in 1955 by Lieutenant Colonel Hesamuddin Ahmed.The federation is located in Gulshan, Dhaka. Lieutenant General Ataul Hakim Sarwar Hasan is the President of Bangladesh Shooting Sports Federation.

References

1955 establishments in East Pakistan
Sports governing bodies in Bangladesh
Sports organizations established in 1955
National members of the Asian Shooting Confederation
Organisations based in Dhaka